Garibaldo is both a surname and a given name. Notable people with the name include:

Francesco Guistiniano di Garibaldo, 14th-century Doge of Genoa
Vicente Garibaldo (born 1969), Panamanian baseball player
Garibaldo Nizzola (1927–2012), Italian sport wrestler

See also
Garibaldi (surname)